Two sheriffs are elected annually for the City of London by the Liverymen of the City livery companies. Today's sheriffs have only nominal duties, but the historical officeholders had important judicial responsibilities. They have attended the justices at the Central Criminal Court, Old Bailey, since its original role as the court for the City and Middlesex.

The sheriffs live in the Central Criminal Court, Old Bailey, during their year of service, so that one of them can always be attendant on the judges. In Court No 1 the principal chairs on the bench are reserved for their and the Lord Mayor's use, with the Sword of the City hanging behind the bench. It is an invariable custom that the Lord Mayor of London must previously have served as a sheriff.

By a "custom of immemorial usage in the City", the two sheriffs are elected at the Midsummer Common Hall by the Liverymen by acclamation, unless a ballot is demanded from the floor, which takes place within fourteen days. The returning officers at the Common Hall are the Recorder of London (senior Judge of the "Old Bailey") and the outgoing Sheriffs.

As elected officers from the 7th century (excepting 1067 to 1132), the sheriffs' jurisdiction covers the square mile of the City of London. The more recent creation of High Sheriff of Greater London covers areas of London outside the City, which today incorporates parts of several old counties, most notably Middlesex.

History of the office
The title of sheriff, or shire reeve, evolved during the Anglo-Saxon period of English history. The reeve was the representative of the king in a city, town or shire, responsible for collecting taxes and enforcing the law. By the time of the Norman Conquest in 1066, the City of London had sheriffs, usually two at a time. The sheriffs were the most important city officials and collected London's annual taxes on behalf of the royal exchequer; they also had judicial duties in the City's law courts.

Until , the sheriffs were directly appointed by the king. London gained a degree of self-government by a charter granted by Henry I, including the right to choose its own sheriff, a right which was affirmed in an 1141 charter by King Stephen. By Henry's charter, the sheriffs of London also gained jurisdiction over the neighbouring county of Middlesex, paying £300 per annum to the Crown for the privilege. This did not make the county a dependency of the City but rather from that time the City of London and Middlesex were viewed as a single administrative area.

In 1189, an annually elected mayor was introduced as chief magistrate for the City of London (along the lines of some European cities of the time such as Rouen and Liège); this change was reaffirmed by a charter granted by King John in 1215. As such, the sheriffs were relegated to a less senior role in the running of the city, and became subordinate to the mayor. The mayor (later Lord Mayor of London) generally served as sheriff before becoming mayor, and in 1385 the Common Council of London stipulated that every future Lord Mayor should "have previously been Sheriff so that he may be tried as to his governance and bounty before he attains to the Estate of Mayoralty"; this tradition continues to this day.

In 1889 the jurisdiction of the sheriffs was restricted to the City. The Local Government Act 1888 created a new office of High Sheriff of Middlesex appointed in the same manner as other English and Welsh counties. At the same time, the most populous parts of Middlesex were included in the new County of London, which had its own High Sheriff.

List of sheriffs of London

See also
List of lord mayors of London

Footnotes

References

 
Ceremonial officers in the United Kingdom
Local government in London
City of London
London